For the 2010 FIFA World Cup qualification, there were two scheduled inter-confederation play-offs to determine the final two qualification spots to the 2010 FIFA World Cup.

Qualified teams
The four teams participating were:

Format
The ties themselves were not drawn, but were allocated by FIFA as:
 AFC Fifth Round winner v OFC Second Round winner
 CONCACAF Fourth Round Fourth Place v CONMEBOL Fifth Place

This allocation allowed better start times of the matches than the previous one because teams were now in closer time zones. The draw for the order in which the two matches were played was held on 2 June 2009 during the FIFA Congress in Nassau, The Bahamas.

Matches

AFC v OFC

New Zealand won 1–0 on aggregate and qualified for the 2010 FIFA World Cup.

CONCACAF v CONMEBOL

Uruguay won 2–1 on aggregate and qualified for the 2010 FIFA World Cup.

Goalscorers 
There were 4 goals scored in 4 matches, for an average of 1 goal per match.

1 goal
  Walter Centeno
  Rory Fallon
  Sebastián Abreu
  Diego Lugano

References 

World Cup Playoffs